Horsethief Canyon, is a canyon comprising the upper part of the Summit Valley in San Bernardino County, California. California State Routes 138 and 173 pass through it.

There is also a separate Horsethief Canyon in San Diego County, California, near Pine Valley, California and the Mexico–United States border. It is located in the Cleveland National Forest, in the Pine Creek Wilderness.

References

Valleys of San Bernardino County, California